Socialization (or socialisation) refers to the lifelong process of inheriting and disseminating norms, customs and ideologies of a society.

Socialization may also refer to:

Socialization (economics), the process of establishing social ownership of the means of production and/or a system of production for use
Socialization (Marxism), the process within capitalism of transforming a solitary economic activity into a collective endeavor
Socialization of animals, process of training animals to be kept by humans in close relationships
Political socialization, the study of the developmental processes by which children and adolescents acquire political cognition, attitudes, and behaviors
Social relation, any relationship between two or more individuals
Conversation, spontaneous communication between two or more people
Socialized medicine, particularly the adoption of such a system

See also
Academic discourse socialization
Anticipatory socialization
Consumer socialization
Primary socialisation
Reciprocal socialization
Socialism